This is a list of filmmakers who have been described as an auteur.

References

Auteurs